Labeshka (also Romanized as Labeshkā; also known as Lishak and Līshkā) is a village in Dehshal Rural District, in the Central District of Astaneh-ye Ashrafiyeh County, Gilan Province, Iran. At the 2006 census, its population was 143, in 41 families.

References 

Populated places in Astaneh-ye Ashrafiyeh County